Mustafa Erdilman (born 1 January 2004) is a Turkish professional footballer who plays as a midfielder for Süper Lig club Antalyaspor.

Career
A youth product of Güneyspor and Antalyaspor, Erdilman signed his first professional contract with the club on 15 December 2021. He made his professional debut with Antalyaspor in a 1–1 (4–2) 2021 Turkish Super Cup penalty shootout loss to Beşiktaş J.K. 5 January 2022, coming on as a late sub in the 98' minute.

International career
Erdilman is a youth international for Turkey, having represented the Turkey U14s, U15s and U16s.

References

External links
 

2004 births
Living people
People from Burdur Province
Turkish footballers
Turkey youth international footballers
Antalyaspor footballers
Süper Lig players
Association football midfielders